The  model (also known as the clock model) is a simplified statistical mechanical spin model. It is a generalization of the Ising model. Although it can be defined on an arbitrary graph, it is integrable only on one and two-dimensional lattices, in several special cases.

Definition 

The  model is defined by assigning a spin value at each node  on a graph, with the spins taking values , where . The spins therefore take values in the form of complex roots of unity. Roughly speaking, we can think of the spins assigned to each node of the  model as pointing in any one of  equidistant directions. The Boltzmann weights for a general edge  are:

Self-dual critical solution

There is a class of solutions to the  model defined on an in general anisotropic square lattice.

–
Requiring the duality relation and the star–triangle relation, which ensures integrability, to hold, it is possible to find the solution:

This particular case of the  model is often called the FZ model in its own right, after V.A. Fateev and A.B. Zamolodchikov who first calculated this solution. It is also a special case of the chiral Potts model and the Kashiwara–Miwa model.

Solvable special cases

As is the case for most lattice models in statistical mechanics, there are no known exact solutions to the  model in three dimensions. Perhaps the most well-known example is the Ising model, which admits spins in two opposite directions (i.e. ).

Quantum version

A quantum version of the  clock model can be constructed in a manner analogous to the transverse-field Ising model. The Hamiltonian of this model is the following:

and 

References 

 V. A. Fateev and A. B. Zamolodchikov (1982); "Self-dual solutions of the star-triangle relations in -models", Physics Letters A, 92, pp. 37–39
 M.A. Rajabpour and J. Cardy (2007); "Discretely holomorphic parafermions in lattice  models" J. Phys. A 22 40, 14703–14714

Spin models
Exactly solvable models
Lattice models
Statistical mechanics